Gisela Legath from Eberau (1908 – 1973) was a Burgenland woman who saved with the help of her two children Martin Legath and Frieda Legath the life of two Hungarian Jews from the Nazis during World War II by providing a shelter in their barn.

A Jewish Hungarian György Krausz (born 1922, in Szombathely/Hungary; died 2000) was 1945 a prisoner in a German work unit marching form Hungary to the Austrian-Hungary border forced to build the German "Südostwall" near the village Eberau in Burgenland.

Confronted with news of an upcoming march to the Concentration Camp (KZ) Mauthausen, Krausz and his friend Cundra decided to escape into the forest to wait for the advancing Russians. Pursued by German soldiers Krausz and Cundra flew into the near village Eberau. On their way to the village the two escapees met the 14-year-old Martin Legath and his 13-year-old sister Frieda Legath. Their mother Gisela Legath knew that the Jews won't be able to survive without their help. Aware of the big danger Gisela Legath decided to provide shelter.

Krausz and Cundra stayed in Gisela's barn till the Red Army liberated the village.

Gisela Legath received the honorary title "righteous among the Nations" from the Yad Vashem remembrance authority in Jerusalem.

Further reading 
 Lexikon der Gerechten unter den Völkern: Deutsche und Österreicher. Hrsg. von Israel Gutman et al. Wallstein Verlag, Göttingen 2005,

References

External links 
 Holocaust Memorial Service
 Gisela Legath – her activity to save Jews' lives during the Holocaust, at Yad Vashem website

Hungarian Righteous Among the Nations
Austrian Righteous Among the Nations
People from Güssing District
1908 births
1973 deaths